Yugong may refer to:

 Yu Gong, or Tribute of Yu, in the Book of Documents
 Yugong, the protagonist in The Foolish Old Man Removes the Mountains